The list of threatened flora of Australia includes all plant species listed as critically endangered or endangered in Australia under the Environment Protection and Biodiversity Conservation Act 1999 (EPBC Act).

Critically endangered

Endangered

See also
Flora of Australia
List of extinct flora of Australia
ROTAP
Threatened fauna of Australia

References

External links
   Attribution 3.0 Australia (CC BY 3.0 AU) licence.

  

Threatened
Lists of plants of Australia
.Australia
Australian plants
Australian plants
.T
.